is an anime television series produced first by Zuiyo Enterprise and Asahi Broadcasting Corporation of Osaka. After the first 6 episodes, Zuiyo Enterprise would split into Zuiyo Company and Nippon Animation, which retained the rights of the series. The series consisted of 52 episodes and was originally telecast from April 1975 to April 1976 on the NET (now TV Asahi) network, with which ABC (not to be confused with the Tokyo-based TV Asahi) is affiliated. Based on the classic children's book The Adventures of Maya the Bee by Waldemar Bonsels, the anime series has become extremely popular in Europe and has been rebroadcast in countries and languages all around the world since its premiere. A film edited from the first few episodes was released on 15 December 1977.

Two English-dubbed versions of the series exist, a South African version produced by Sonovision for the South African Broadcasting Corporation (SABC), using a translated version of the theme tune used for the German dub, and featuring English South African accents for the characters; and a United States version with an entirely new theme tune, and a Canadian voice cast, produced by Saban Entertainment, which was broadcast from 1 January 1990 to 31 December 1992 on the children's television channel Nickelodeon. Maya the Bee aired alongside other juvenile-targeted anime such as Adventures of the Little Koala, Noozles and The Littl' Bits as part of Nickelodeon's Nick Jr. block of programming for young children. 65 episodes were dubbed.

A second Maya the Bee series, was a co-production made in 1979 by Wako Productions and Austrian/German Apollo Film, Wien. The second series first premiered in Germany (ZDF) from September 1979 to September 1980. The very different and cartoon-like second series, which lasted for 52 episodes, was not very popular and did not premiere in Japan until 12 October 1982, on TV Osaka, and aired through 27 September 1983.

Story 
The story centres on Maya, an inquisitive, adventurous and somewhat flighty young honeybee, and her adventures in the forest around her. Maya is born in a bee hive during internal unrest: the hive is dividing itself into two new colonies. Maya is raised by her teacher, Mrs. Cassandra. Despite Mrs. Cassandra's warnings, Maya wants to explore the wide world and commits the unforgivable crime of leaving the hive. During her adventures, Maya, now in exile, befriends other insects and braves dangers with them.

In the last two episodes of the first series, Maya is taken prisoner by hornets, the bees' sworn enemies. Prisoner of the hornets, Maya learns of a hornet plan to attack her native hive. Maya is faced with the decision to either return to hive and suffer her due punishment, saving the hive, or leaving the plan unannounced, saving herself but destroying the hive. As may be expected, Maya, after severe pondering, makes the decision to return. In the hive, she announces the coming attack and is, totally unexpectedly, pardoned. The forewarned bees triumph over the hornet attack force. Maya, now a heroine of the hive, becomes a teacher, like Mrs. Cassandra and shares her experiences and wisdom with the future generation.

Characters 
 

The main character of the story, an inquisitive, adventurous and somewhat flighty young honeybee.
 

A young drone (male bee) who is Maya's best friend. He is always tired, hungry, skeptical, also somewhat of a coward but generally good-natured. Prone to jealousy when Maya's attentions turn to others. Often reluctantly dragged into adventures by Maya. He is an original character in the anime.

A wise, top-hatted grasshopper, a good friend of Maya and Willy.

Maya's teacher and chief authority figure (mostly in the first animated series).

Staff

Japanese version 
 Production: Zuiyo Eizo then Nippon Animation
 Executive producer: Kōichi Motohashi 
 Series directors: Hiroshi Saitō, Mitsuo Kaminashi, Seiji Endō
 Script: Hikaru Sasa, Hitoshi Kanazawa
 Screenplay: Fumi Takahashi
 Character Designs: Susumu Shiraume
 Animation Directors: Susumu Shiraume, Takao Ogawa, Hayao Nobe
 Sound: Yasuhiro Koyama
 Theme songs (performed by Chīta and the Honey Bee Choir, words and music by Seizō Ise):
 OP – 
 ED 

 performed by Yōko Maekawa

American version 
 Executive producer: Haim Saban
 Supervising producer: Winston Richard
 Writer: Tim Reid
 Voice Direction: Tim Reid, Kathleen Fee
 Associate producer: Eric S. Rollman
 Executive in charge of production: Jerald E. Bergh
 Music by: Haim Saban and Shuki Levy

Home video 
Several episodes of Saban's dub were released on VHS by Video Treasures in the United States and HGV Video Productions in Canada under the Saban Video label.

References

External links 
 Maya the Bee – Nippon Animation Official Site
 

Maya the Bee
1975 anime television series debuts
1979 anime television series debuts
1982 anime television series debuts
Nickelodeon original programming
1976 German television series debuts
1980 German television series endings
German children's animated adventure television series
German children's animated comedy television series
Japanese children's animated adventure television series
Japanese children's animated comedy television series
German-language television shows
Nick Jr. original programming
YTV (Canadian TV channel) original programming
CBC Television original programming
Nippon Animation
Television shows adapted into comics
Television shows based on children's books
Animated television series about insects
Television series by Saban Entertainment
TV Asahi original programming
TV Tokyo original programming
ZDF original programming
1970s children's television series